Following is a list of minerals that serve as copper ores in the copper mining process:

References

Copper ores
Mining-related lists